Healthcare reform advocacy groups in the United States are non-profit organizations in the US who have as one of their primary goals healthcare reform in the United States.

These notable organizations address issues such as universal healthcare, national health insurance, and single-payer healthcare.

Advocacy groups

 American Medical Student Association
 American Nurses Association
 Business Leaders for Health Care Transformation https://www.blhct.org
 California Nurses Association/National Nurses Organizing Committee
 Campaign for Better Health Care
Center for Health Progress
 Colorado Consumer Health Initiative
 Consumers for Affordable Health Care
 Community Catalyst
Doctors For America
 Families USA
 Florida Voices for Health
 Georgians for a Healthy Future
 Health Access California
 Health Action New Mexico
 Health Care for All (Massachusetts)
 Health Care for All Minnesota https://hca-mn.org
 Health Care for America NOW!
 Healthcare-NOW!
 Kentucky Voices for Health
 Maryland Health Care for All! Coalition
 Medicare Rights Center
 National Coalition on Health Care
 National Physicians Alliance (merged into Doctors for America, 2019) 
 Pennsylvania Health Access Network
 Pennsylvania Medical Society
 Physicians for a National Health Program
 Universal Health Care Foundation of Connecticut
 We Can Do Better (formerly Archimedes Movement)
 Whole Washington

Campaigns within larger groups
 AARP
 Democracy for America
 Democratic Socialists of America
 MoveOn.org
 National Conference of State Legislatures
 Progressive Democrats of America

Policy institutes
 Brookings Institution
 Cato Institute
 Commonwealth Fund
 Robert Wood Johnson Foundation
 Kaiser Family Foundation

See also

 Healthcare in the United States
 Medicare (United States)
 Medicare for All Act

References

 UHCAN, listing of health care reform groups with various national and state groups' contact information.

 
Healthcare reform advocacy groups in the United States